En Thangai ( My Sister) is an Indian Tamil-language soap opera that aired Monday through Saturday on Raj TV from 4 May 2015 to 2 January 2016 at 6:30PM IST for 188 episodes. The show starred Pandiarajan, Ramya, Anu Mohan, Lakshmi Raj and among others. It was produced by produced by RR Telefilms and directed by Mangai Arirajan.

Cast

International broadcast
  In Sri Lanka Tamil Channel on Nethra TV. 
  In Canada Tamil Channel on Tamil Entertainment Television.

References

External links
 Raj TV Official Site
 Raj Television Network
 Raj TV on Youtube

Raj TV television series
2015 Tamil-language television series debuts
2010s Tamil-language television series
Tamil-language television shows
2016 Tamil-language television series endings